Alastair Thain (born 1961) is a German-born photographer. His portraits were published in 1991 as Skin Deep, and many are held in the collection of the National Portrait Gallery, London. With Tom Stoddart, he made work about the Siege of Sarajevo, which was exhibited at the Royal Festival Hall in London and published as a book.

Early life and education
Thain was born in Düsseldorf, Germany and studied at the London College of Printing.

Publications
Skin Deep: The Portraits of Alastair Thain. Viking, 1991. . With an essay by Jane Withers.
Edge of Madness: Sarajevo, a city and its people under siege. London: Royal Festival Hall, 1997. With Tom Stoddart.

Exhibitions

Solo exhibitions or with one other person
Edge of Madness – Sarajevo a City and Its People Under Siege, Royal Festival Hall, London, 1997. With Tom Stoddart.
Marines: Portraits by Alastair Thain, externally, Imperial War Museum North, Manchester, 2009

Group exhibitions
How We Are: Photographing Britain, Tate Britain, London, 2007. Co-curated by Susan Bright and Val Williams.

Collections
Thain's work is held in the following permanent collection:
National Portrait Gallery, London: 23 portrait prints (as of 30 November 2021)

References

21st-century photographers
20th-century photographers
People from Düsseldorf
Alumni of the London College of Printing
Living people
1961 births
Portrait photographers